Manautea is a genus of beetles in the family Cicindelidae, containing the following species:

 Manautea gracilior Deuve, 2006
 Manautea millei Deuve, 2006
 Manautea minimior Deuve, 2006
 Manautea tripotini Deuve, 2006

References

Cicindelidae